Fire and brimstone is an idiomatic expression of God's wrath in the Bible.

Fire and Brimstone or Fire & Brimstone may also refer to:

Music
Fire & Brimstone (album), a 2019 album by Brantley Gilbert
"Fire and Brimstone", a song by Black Lungs on the 2008 album Send Flowers
"Fire and Brimstone", a song by Bride on the 1988 album Live to Die
"Fire and Brimstone", a song by Chris Bailey performed by The Saints on the 1988 album Prodigal Son
"Fire and Brimstone", a song by David Blake performed by rapper DJ Quik on the 2011 album The Book of David
"Fire and Brimstone", a song by Dragonland on the 2011 album Under the Grey Banner
"Fire and Brimstone", a song by Dropkick Murphys originally as a 1997 EP, re-released on the 2000 album The Singles Collection, Volume 1
"Fire and Brimstone", a song by Link Wray on his eponymous 1971 album, Link Wray
"Fire and Brimstone", a song by Troy "Trombone Shorty" Andrews on the 2013 album Say That to Say This

Other uses
 Fire & Brimstone (Deadlands), a 1998 role-playing game supplement
 Fire and Brimstone (Doctor Who), a Doctor Who story first appearing in 1997 in the Doctor Who Magazine
 The Order of Fire and Brimstone, an organizing board for the Vulcan Krewe in the Saint Paul Winter Carnival

See also 
 Brimstone (disambiguation)
 Fire (disambiguation)
 "Hellfire and Brimstone" (Ultimate X-Men), a story arc in Marvel Comics Ultimate X-Men series